Fort Polk North is a census-designated place (CDP) in Vernon Parish, Louisiana, United States. The population was 3,279 at the 2000 census. It is part of the Fort Polk South Micropolitan Statistical Area.

Geography
Fort Polk North is located at  (31.103611, -93.168617).

Demographics

As of the census of 2000, there were 3,279 people, 1,076 households, and 1,039 families residing in the CDP. The racial makeup of the CDP was 62.9% White, 21.3% African American, 1.3% Native American, 2.1% Asian, 0.6% Pacific Islander, 5.1% from other races, and 6.7% from two or more races. Hispanic or Latino of any race were 11.9% of the population.

There were 1,076 households, out of which 67.8% had children under the age of 18 living with them, 91.5% were married couples living together, 4.0% had a female householder with no husband present, and 3.4% were non-families. 3.2% of all households were made up of individuals, and none had someone living alone who was 65 years of age or older. The average household size was 3.05 and the average family size was 3.10.

In the CDP, the population was spread out, with 36.2% under the age of 18, 20.8% from 18 to 24, 42.2% from 25 to 44, 0.7% from 45 to 64, and 0.1% who were 65 years of age or older. The median age was 23 years. For every 100 females, there were 101.3 males. For every 100 females age 18 and over, there were 99.2 males.

The median income for a household in the CDP was $31,921, and the median income for a family was $32,037. Males had a median income of $25,729 versus $19,044 for females. The per capita income for the CDP was $11,425. About 8.7% of families and 10.2% of the population were below the poverty line, including 11.7% of those under age 18 and none of those age 65 or over.

References

Census-designated places in Louisiana
Census-designated places in Vernon Parish, Louisiana